Division No. 7, Subd. K is an unorganized subdivision on the Bonavista Peninsula in Newfoundland and Labrador, Canada. It is in Division No. 7 on Trinity Bay.

According to the 2001 Statistics Canada Census:
Population: 1,152
% Change (1996-2001): -9.9
Dwellings: 695
Area (km2.): 486.16
Density (persons per km2.): 2.4

Newfoundland and Labrador subdivisions